Never Let Me Go is a 2005 dystopian science fiction novel by the British author Kazuo Ishiguro. It was shortlisted for the 2005 Man Booker Prize (an award Ishiguro had previously won in 1989 for The Remains of the Day), for the 2006 Arthur C. Clarke Award and for the 2005 National Book Critics Circle Award. Time magazine named it the best novel of 2005 and included the novel in its "100 Best English-language novels published since 1923—the beginning of TIME". It also received an ALA Alex Award in 2006. A film adaptation directed by Mark Romanek was released in 2010; a Japanese television drama aired in 2016.

Background 
Never Let Me Go, Ishiguro’s sixth novel, takes place in an alternate reality of England during the 1990s in which human cloning is authorized and performed. Ishiguro started writing Never Let Me Go in 1990. It was originally titled “The Student’s Novel.”

Plot 
The story begins with Kathy H., who describes herself as a carer, talking about looking after organ donors. She has been a carer for almost twelve years at the time of narration, and she often reminisces about her time spent at Hailsham, a boarding school in England, where the teachers are known as guardians. The children are watched closely and are often told about the importance of producing art and of being healthy (smoking is considered a taboo, almost on the level of a crime, and working in the vegetable garden is compulsory). The students' art is then displayed in an exhibition, and the best art is chosen by a woman known to the students as Madame, who keeps their work in a gallery. Kathy develops a close friendship with two other students: Ruth and Tommy. Kathy develops a fondness for Tommy by looking after him when he is bullied and having private talks with him. However, Tommy and Ruth form a relationship instead.

In an isolated incident, Miss Lucy, one of the guardians, tells the students that they are clones who were created to donate organs to others (similar to saviour siblings) and that after their donations, they will die young. She implies that if the students are to live decent lives, they must know the truth: their lives are already predetermined. Miss Lucy is removed from the school as a result of her disclosure, but the students passively accept their fate.

Ruth, Tommy and Kathy move to the Cottages when they are 16 years old. It is the first time they are allowed in the outside world, but they keep to themselves most of the time. Ruth and Tommy are still together, and Kathy has some sexual relationships with other men. Two older housemates, who had not been at Hailsham, tell Ruth that they have seen a "possible" for Ruth, an older woman who resembles her and thus could be the woman from whom she was cloned. As a result, the five of them go on a trip to see her, but the two older students first want to discuss a rumour they have heard: that a couple can have their donations deferred if they can prove that they are truly in love. They believe that the privilege is for Hailsham students only and so wrongly expect that the others know how to apply for it. They  find the possible, but the resemblance to Ruth is only superficial, which causes  Ruth to wonder angrily whether they were all cloned from "human trash".

During the trip, Kathy and Tommy separate from the others and look for a copy of a music cassette tape that Kathy had lost when at Hailsham. Tommy's recollection of the tape and desire to find it for her make clear the depth of his feelings for Kathy. They find the tape of Songs After Dark by Judy Bridgewater, and Tommy shares with Kathy a theory that the reason Madame collected their art was to determine which couples were truly in love and cites a teacher who had said that their art revealed their souls. After the trip, Kathy and Tommy do not tell Ruth of the found tape or of Tommy's theory about the deferral.

When Ruth finds out about the tape and Tommy's theory, she takes an opportunity to drive a wedge between Tommy and Kathy. Shortly afterward, she tells Kathy that even if Ruth and Tommy were to split up, Tommy would never enter into a relationship with Kathy because of her sexual history. A few weeks later, Kathy applies to become a carer, meaning that she will not see Ruth or Tommy for about ten years.

After that, Ruth's first donation goes badly and her health deteriorates. Kathy becomes Ruth's carer, and both are aware that Ruth's next donation will probably be her last. Ruth suggests that she and Kathy take a trip and take Tommy with them. During the trip, Ruth expresses regret for keeping Kathy and Tommy apart. Attempting to make amends, Ruth hands them Madame's address, urging them to seek a deferral. Shortly afterward, Ruth makes her second donation and completes, an implied euphemism for dying and donating their remaining organs.

Kathy becomes Tommy's carer, and they form a relationship. Encouraged by Ruth's last wishes, they go to Madame's house to see if they can defer Tommy's fourth donation, taking Tommy's artwork with them to support their claim that they are truly in love. They find Madame at her house, and also meet Miss Emily, their former headmistress, who lives with her. The two women reveal that guardians tried to give the clones a humane education, unlike other institutions. The gallery was a place meant to convey to the outside world that the clones are in fact normal human beings with a soul and deserve better treatment. It is revealed that the experiment failed, which is why Hailsham was closed. When Kathy and Tommy ask about the deferral they find out that such deferrals never existed.

Tommy, knowing that his next donation will end his life, confronts Kathy about her work as a carer. Kathy resigns as Tommy's carer but still visits him. The novel ends after Tommy's "completion", and Kathy drives up to Norfolk and briefly fantasizes about everything she remembers and everything she lost.

Title 
Never Let Me Go stems from a song that Kathy listened to throughout her life. Kathy found the song “Never Let Me Go” on a Judy Bridgewater tape she purchased at one of the Sales of Hailsham. When Kathy would feel alone, she would play the song on repeat. Kathy often used to sing to and dance to the chorus: "Baby, never let me go." On one occasion, while dancing and singing, she notices Madame watching her and crying. Madame explains the encounter when they meet at the end of the book. While Kathy reveals to the reader that she was simply thinking about holding a child, Madame connects the dancing and the song to what they are doing to the children. She is overwhelmed by guilt and sadness and thus starts to cry when she sees Kathy. 

The title of the novel also reflects the central struggle of Kathy’s character. She struggles between what she should hold on to in life and what she should let go of. In other words, Kathy “never lets go” of her memories. 

In another section of the book, Kathy refers to the three main characters "letting each other go" after leaving the cottages.

Characters

Main character(s) 
Kathy – The protagonist and narrator of the novel. She is a 31-year-old clone who was raised to be an organ donor. During her childhood, Kathy is free-spirited, kind, and loving, and she stands up for what is right. At the end of the novel, Kathy is a young woman who does not show much emotion when she looks back on her past. As an adult, she criticises people less and is accepting of the lives of her friends.
Tommy – A male donor and a childhood friend of Kathy. He is introduced as an uncreative and isolated young boy at Hailsham. He has a bad temper and is the object of many tricks played on him by the other children because of his short temper. Initially, he reacts by having bad temper tantrums, until Miss Lucy, a Hailsham guardian, tells him something that for the short term positively changes his life: it is okay if he is not creative. He feels great relief. Years later, Miss Lucy tells him that she should not have said that, and Tommy goes through another transformation. Once again upset by his lack of artistic skills, he becomes a quiet and sad teenager. As he matures, Tommy becomes a young man who is generally calm and thoughtful.
Ruth – A childhood friend of Kathy, Ruth is a female donor from Hailsham who is described by Kathy as bossy. At the start of the novel, she is an extrovert with strong opinions and appears to be the center of social activity in her cohort, but she is not as confident as the narrator initially perceived. She had hope for her future, but her hopes are crushed as she realises that she was born to be a donor and has no other future. At the Cottages, Ruth undergoes a transformation to become a more aware person and begins to think about things in depth. She constantly tries to fit in and be mature and repudiates things from her past if she perceives those things will negatively affect her image. She threw away her entire collection of art by fellow students, which were once her prized possessions, because she sensed that the older kids at The Cottages looked down on it. She becomes an adult who is deeply unhappy and regretful. Ruth eventually gives up on all of her hopes and dreams and tries to help Kathy and Tommy have a better life.

Minor character(s) 
Madame (Marie-Claude) – A woman who visits Hailsham to pick up the children's artwork. Described as a mystery by the students at Hailsham, she appears professional and stern, and a young Kathy describes her as distant and forbidding. When the children decide to play a prank on her and swarm around her to see what she will do, they are shocked to discover that she seems disgusted by them. In a different circumstance, she silently watches Kathy dance to a song called "Never Let Me Go" and weeps at the sight. Neither talks about it until years later. Kathy interpreted the song's meaning as a woman who cannot have a baby, but Madame wept at the thought of clones not being permitted live long, happy, and healthy lives, unlike humans.
Miss Emily – Headmistress of Hailsham. She can be very sharp, according to Kathy. The children thought that she had an extra sense that allowed her to know where children were hiding.
Miss Lucy – A teacher at Hailsham with whom the children feel comfortable. She is one of the younger teachers at Hailsham and tells the students very frankly that they exist only for organ donation. She feels a lot of stress at Hailsham and is fired for what she tells the students.
Miss Geraldine – A guardian at Hailsham who works with younger students with teaching art. 
Chrissie – Another female donor, who is slightly older than the three main characters and was with them at the Cottages. She and her boyfriend, Rodney, were the ones who found Ruth's possible, the person from whom Ruth might have been cloned, and they took Kathy, Tommy, and Ruth to Norfolk. She completes (dies because of her organ donations) before the book ends.
Rodney – Chrissie's boyfriend, the one who originally saw Ruth's possible. He and Chrissie are mentioned to have broken up before she completed.

Analysis 
Ishiguro has stated that the novel began with a plot involving a nuclear bomb, but that he then began to wonder "what the 20th century might have looked like if the incredible developments that took place in nuclear physics, culminating in the creation of the atom and hydrogen bombs, had taken place instead in the field of biology, specifically in cloning.”

In Contemporary Literature, author Anne Whitehead highlights the novel's focus on healthcare as particularly thought-provoking, with Kathy's status as a "carer" defining much of her adult life. Whitehead writes, "[Kathy's] preoccupations with professional success and with minor inconsistencies in the system mean that she is not addressing either her own imminent death or the larger inequities and injustices at work," and wonders, "Is 'caring,' viewed in this light, a form of labor that is socially valuable because Kathy is making a positive difference to others (preventing "agitation"), or—given the political resonances of Ishiguro's choice of word here—is it a means of preventing resistance and unrest?"

John Mullan speculates that the novel's modern setting is "calculated to have a defamiliarizing effect. While this novel measures carefully the passing of time, its chronology, we soon realize, is removed from any historical reality that we can recognize.”

Reception 
Louis Menand, in The New Yorker, described the novel as "quasi-science-fiction", saying, "even after the secrets have been revealed, there are still a lot of holes in the story [...] it's because, apparently, genetic science isn't what the book is about". 

Sarah Kerr, in The New York Times, characterizes the novel's setup as "potentially dime-store-novel" and "an enormous gamble," but elaborates that "the theme of cloning lets [Ishiguro] push to the limit ideas he's nurtured in earlier fiction about memory and the human self; the school's hothouse seclusion makes it an ideal lab for his fascination with cliques, loyalty and friendship." 

Horror author Ramsey Campbell labeled it one of the best horror novels since 2000, a "classic instance of a story that's horrifying, precisely because the narrator doesn't think it is". 

Joseph O'Neill from The Atlantic suggested that the novel successfully fits into the coming of age genre. O'Neill writes that "Ishiguro's imagining of the children's misshapen little world is profoundly thoughtful, and their hesitant progression into knowledge of their plight is an extreme and heartbreaking version of the exodus of all children from the innocence in which the benevolent but fraudulent adult world conspires to place them". 

Theo Tait, a writer for The Telegraph, wrote: "Gradually, it dawns on the reader that Never Let Me Go is a parable about mortality. The horribly indoctrinated voices of the Hailsham students who tell each other pathetic little stories to ward off the grisly truth about the future—they belong to us; we've been told that we're all going to die, but we've not really understood".

In 2019, the novel ranked 4th on The Guardian'''s list of the 100 best books of the 21st century.

 Adaptations 

Mark Romanek directed a 2010 film adaptation of Never Let Me Go starring Carey Mulligan as Kathy, Andrew Garfield as Tommy, and Keira Knightley as Ruth.

In Japan 2014, the Horipro agency produced a stage adaptation in called Watashi wo Hanasanaide''. Directors include Ken Yoshida, Takeyoshi Yamamoto, Yuichiro Hirakawa, and Akimi Yoshida. 

In 2016 under the same title, Tokyo Broadcasting System Television aired a television drama adaptation set in Japan starring Haruka Ayase as Kyoko Hoshina and Haruma Miura as Tomohiko Doi.

A television series adaptation was in the works at FX and was to be produced by DNA TV, Searchlight Television and FXP, with Andrew Macdonald, Allon Reich, Marc Munden and Melissa Iqbal executive producing. It would premiere on Hulu in the United States, Star in other territories and Star+ in Latin America with Viola Prettejohn, Tracey Ullman and Kelly Macdonald starring. However, in February 2023, it was announced FX had cancelled the series before production on the series even began.

References

External links 
James Wood review

2005 British novels
Dystopian novels
Fiction with unreliable narrators
Novels by Kazuo Ishiguro
2005 science fiction novels
British novels adapted into films
Novels about cloning
Novels set in Sussex
Novels set in Norfolk
Organ transplantation in fiction
Faber and Faber books
British science fiction novels
British horror novels
British bildungsromans
British novels adapted into television shows